Francis Baskerville (born 1615) was an English politician who sat in the House of Commons in 1640.

Baskerville was the son of Thomas Baskerville of Richardston Wiltshire and his wife Joan Lor.

In April 1640, Baskerville was elected Member of Parliament for Marlborough in the Short Parliament. 
 
Baskerville married Margaret Glanville daughter of Sir John Glanville of Broad Hinton Wiltshire in April 1635.

References

1615 births
Year of death missing
English MPs 1640 (April)